The 1938 California Golden Bears football team was an American football team that represented the University of California, Berkeley in the Pacific Coast Conference (PCC) during the 1938 college football season. In their fourth year under head coach Stub Allison, the team compiled a 10–1 record (6–1 against PCC opponents), finished in a tie for the PCC championship, was ranked No. 14 in the final AP Poll, and outscored its opponents by a combined total of 219 to 44.

Schedule

References

California
California Golden Bears football seasons
Pac-12 Conference football champion seasons
California Golden Bears football